Scott Edelman (born 1955) is an American science fiction, fantasy, and horror writer and editor.

Career
In the 1970s, he worked in American comic books, in particular writing horror comics for both Marvel Comics and DC Comics. For Marvel he created the Scarecrow, and wrote some stories involving Captain America, Captain Marvel, and Omega the Unknown. He edited two issues of Marvel's self-produced fan magazine, FOOM, in the mid-1970s.

Edelman has also written a number of short stories, the Lambda Award-nominated novel The Gift, and written for television, including work for Hanna-Barbera and several episodes of Tales from the Darkside.

He was the founding and only editor of the science fiction magazine Science Fiction Age, which was published from 1992 until 2000. He published and edited the semi-professional magazine Last Wave from 1982 to 1985, which was billed as "The Last Best Hope of Speculative Fiction" and published short fiction by Thomas M. Disch, Avram Davidson, and Ian Watson among other established authors. He was the founding editor of Rampage, a magazine covering professional wrestling, and has written unauthorized biographies of wrestlers Chyna and Stone Cold Steve Austin. Other magazines edited by Edelman include Sci-Fi Universe, Sci-Fi Flix, and Satellite Orbit.

He became the editor of SCI FI Magazine (the official print magazine of The Sci Fi Channel) in 2002, and has edited the channel's online magazine Science Fiction Weekly since 2000.

Edelman wrote stories that were included in Eden Studios's zombie anthologies edited by James Lowder.

Awards

Publications

Novellas 

 The Gift (1990)
 These Words Are Haunted (2001)
 What We Still Talk About (2008)
 The Hunger of Empty Vessels (2009)
 What Will Come After (2010)
 "Almost the Last Story by Almost the Last Man," in The Living Dead, edited by John Joseph Adams (2008)
 Things That Never Happened (2010)
 Liars, Fakers, and the Dead Who Eat Them, illustrated by Daniele Serra (2017)
 Tell Me Like You Done Before: And Other Stories Written on the Shoulders of Giants (2018)

Comics 

 Captain Marvel #49 (1968)
 Captain Marvel #50 (1968)
 Captain Marvel #51 (1968)
 Captain Marvel #52 (1968)
 Captain Marvel #53 (1968)
 Captain Marvel #54 (1968)
 Captain Marvel #55 (1968)
 Doorway to Nightmare #5 (1978)
 Marvel Masterworks: Captain Marvel, Vol. 5 (2014)

Biographies 

 Texas Rattlesnake (2000)
 Warrior Queen: The Totally Unauthorized Story of Joanie Laurer (2000)

References

External links
 
 
 
 
 SCI FI Magazine: Official Site
 Sci Fi Weekly
 Biography from the Readercon site

1955 births
20th-century American novelists
American comics writers
American horror writers
American magazine editors
American male novelists
American science fiction writers
Living people
American male short story writers
Science fiction editors
20th-century American short story writers
20th-century American male writers
20th-century American non-fiction writers
American male non-fiction writers